John Orr (1870-date of death unknown), was a Scottish international lawn bowls player who competed in the 1930 British Empire Games.

Bowls career
At the 1930 British Empire Games he won the bronze medal in the rinks (fours) event with David Fraser, William Campbell and Canadian Tom Chambers who joined the team following the death of original team member J Kennedy.

Personal life
He was a doctor by trade and lived in Park Terrace, Edinburgh.

References

Scottish male bowls players
Bowls players at the 1930 British Empire Games
Commonwealth Games bronze medallists for Scotland
Commonwealth Games medallists in lawn bowls
1870 births
Year of death missing
Medallists at the 1930 British Empire Games